Dream Machine is the sixth studio album by German rock band Tokio Hotel. It was released by Starwatch Music on March 3, 2017 worldwide. The album is available at retail and online stores with two versions available: a standard edition CD/vinyl (10 tracks) and a limited deluxe box edition (includes album CD, a CD of instrumental version of the album, a vinyl of single "What If" with a bonus track and Bill's personal notebook of handwritten notes, photos and other notes).

Background
The band first announced that they were beginning work on a new album back in 2015 while filming for one of the episodes of their web series "Tokio Hotel TV". Since then, Bill posted some lyrics and sneak peeks on his Instagram account. The album was made for pre-order on December 23, 2016 on iTunes and Amazon with first promo single "Something New" made available for instant download. The lead single "What If" was released on December 29, 2016.

Reception
Critical response to album was mixed. "MusikExpress" gave the album 2 out of 5 stars rating, calling it a "boom-boom-autotune". Overall, the album was mostly praised for lyrical improvements but criticized for the use of Auto-Tune.

Track listing

Personnel
Credits adapted from the album's booklet.

Tokio Hotel
Bill Kaulitz - lead vocals
Tom Kaulitz - guitars (tracks 1-4, 6-10), additional bass (tracks 7, 10), piano (tracks 3, 5-6, 8-10), keys, percussion (tracks 1-4, 6-10), programmings
Georg Listing - bass (tracks 1-4, 6-10)
Gustav Schäfer - drums (tracks 1, 3-4, 6-10), percussion (track 2)

Additional personnel
Devon Culiner - keys (tracks 1, 3-5, 8-9), percussion (tracks 3-4, 8-9), programmings (tracks 1, 3-6, 8-9)

Charts

References

Tokio Hotel albums
2017 albums